The Double Man is a 1967 British spy film directed by Franklin Schaffner. Its plot is very loosely based on the critically acclaimed 1958 novel Legacy of a Spy by Henry S. Maxfield. As in the novel, much of the action takes place in the Austrian Alps. The film stars Yul Brynner as a CIA agent investigating his son's fatal "accident": although he learns a few things from others, he slowly is convinced something else is happening and discovers a fiendish Russian plan.

Plot
During the Cold War a Russian intelligence officer tells an army general he has a plan to infiltrate the upper ranks of the American CIA. He assures the army general it cannot fail. The general approves the plan, but is skeptical and warns the intelligence officer of the fatal consequences should anything go wrong.

In Washington, top CIA official Dan Slater (Yul Brynner) receives a cable informing him that his teenaged son has been killed while skiing in the Austrian Alps. Befitting his position he is suspicious of the official report that it was an accident, and immediately flies over to investigate. He is mindful that things may have been arranged by his enemies to lure him into the open.

In the town at the base of the ski resort where the son died, Slater meets up with Frank Wheatley (Clive Revill), a friend and ex-colleague who years earlier had tired of the paranoid approach to life demanded of intelligence agents. They discuss the case, with Wheatley arguing against Slater’s suspicious instincts. As they move through town they are surreptitiously watched by the Russian intelligence officer, who tells his two burly subordinates that his plan is unfolding perfectly.

Slater retains his doubts, but accepts that there is no evidence that his son was intentionally killed. However on his way out of town he finds his son’s bloody ski clothes packed in his own baggage. He returns to town and confronts Wheatley with the discovery. Wheatley cannot account for it, and they quarrel. It is revealed that Wheatley was emotionally distant from his son and deceased wife. When Slater accuses Wheatley of becoming soft and complacent and Wheatley responds that Slater’s only real love was for his work, Slater punches him in the face.

Investigating further, Slater tracks down the young lady who took the same cable car as did his son on the day he was killed. She is Gina (Britt Ekland), a ski-lover working for a rich local woman who throws extravagant ski parties. At one of those parties Slater talks to Gina. She tells him there were two other men in the cable car, but is only able to give a cursory description of one of them. It is not much to go on, but when, shortly afterward, that man asks her to dance, she chases after Slater to tell him. The man has left, but Slater and Wheatley trace him to a farm on the outskirts of town. While Wheatley waits at the end of a long driveway, Slater enters the farmhouse. The Russian intelligence officer’s two henchmen (one of whom is the man from the party) confront him, and a fight ensues during which a gun goes off.

Wheatley, hearing the shot, starts to drive away from the scene. He quickly changes his mind and returns to the farmhouse. He arrives just in time to pick up Slater, running out of the farmhouse, and together they drive off. Slater returns to the party and has a confrontation with Gina in her bedroom. He attacks her, but she fights back and claws at his face. Wheatley enters the room and talks Slater out of any further violence.

While Slater has been investigating, his superior officer had been growing increasingly agitated. He had contacted the nearest CIA agent and told him to track Slater down and put him on the next plane to Washington. The agent arrives in town.

After the confrontation with Gina, Slater goes back alone to the farmhouse. There, the plot as revealed in the film’s title is confirmed. The Slater who ran out of the farmhouse is a lookalike double whose resemblance to Slater has been perfected with plastic surgery. The Russian plan is to replace Slater with the double, who has spent years learning to imitate Slater’s voice, speech pattern and attitudes. The plan requires the CIA braintrust to believe that the murder of Slater’s son was indeed part of a plot to lure Slater in and then kill him. Everything that followed, including the slow revelation of information that fueled Slater’s investigation, his conversations and fights with Wheatley and Gina, and even his having to be rescued and forcibly sent back to Washington, were all part of the plot to ensure that no-one would ever suspect Slater has been replaced by a lookalike double.

All this is revealed to Slater in the farmhouse, while he is handcuffed and immobile, by the Russian intelligence officer and the double. Slater mocks the plan, saying the double will never be able to imitate him convincingly. The Russian intelligence officer counters that any other differences between the double’s mannerisms and Slater’s will be attributed to Slater being in mourning for his son’s death, plus the subsequent intrigue. The double reconnects with Wheatley, who has been joined by the agent sent to make sure Slater flies home immediately, and the Russian plan seems about to succeed.

One of the last pieces of the plan calls for the real Dan Slater to be killed and his body secretly disposed of. Slater, handcuffed and gagged but fully conscious and with his legs unrestrained, is put in a car that is to drive him out of town, never to be seen again. However the car gets held up by a raucous group of slow-moving partiers on their way to a nighttime ski run. When the driver steps out to shout at the partiers to move aside, Slater escapes. He eludes the immediate pursuit and search for him, but the Russian intelligence officer spots him dashing into the middle of the group of ski revelers on their way to the cable car station. Slater, with the three Russian agents following closely, go up the mountain in the cable car. Slater has not yet ripped off his gag, and does not do anything to reveal himself to the partiers.

Meanwhile Wheatley has had doubts about Slater’s violent attack of Gina, and visits her. The two of them chat and then seek out the double (still thinking he is Slater) who is waiting with the CIA agent to take the next train out of town. When Wheatley mentions he has some doubts about Slater’s attackers, the double, knowing the real Slater would have done so, insists on going with Wheatley to check on the loose ends.

Wheatley, the double and the agent make their way to an otherwise unmanned cable car station halfway up the mountain. There, for several minutes already, the real Slater has been hiding from the Russian pursuers. They have heard him but don’t know exactly where he is, and do not turn on any lights that would help them in their search. It sets the stage for the final confrontation between Slater and the double, with Wheatley, the only armed man among them, having to choose who the real Dan Slater is based on what they say.

Cast
 Yul Brynner as Dan Slater / Kalmar  
 Britt Ekland as Gina  
 Clive Revill as Frank Wheatley  
 Anton Diffring as Berthold  
 Moira Lister as Mrs. Carrington  
 Lloyd Nolan as Edwards  
 George Mikell as Max  
 Brandon Brady as Gregori  
 Julia Arnall as Anna  
 David Bauer as Miller  
 Ronald Radd as General  
 Kenneth J. Warren as Police Chief  
 David Healy as Halstead  
 Carl Jaffe as Police Surgeon  
 Douglas Muir as Wilfred
 Bee Duffell as Woman On Train (Uncredited)

Critical reception
In The New York Times, Renata Adler found it "a modest third-rate film...But the plotting is tight and Mr. Brynner looks exotic and stony enough to keep one's mind off the title; when the denouement comes it is a moderate surprise;" while more recently, Cinema Retro called it "one of the better spy films of the era thanks in no small part to the direction of Franklin J. Schaffner."

References

External links

1967 films
1960s spy films
British spy films
Cold War spy films
Films shot at Associated British Studios
Films based on American novels
Films directed by Franklin J. Schaffner
Films set in Austria
Films about the Central Intelligence Agency
1960s mystery films
Films shot in London
1960s English-language films
1960s British films